Catubig, officially the Municipality of Catubig, is a 3rd class municipality in the province of Northern Samar, Philippines. According to the 2020 census, it has a population of 32,174 people.

History
Catubig was mentioned by historian William Henry Scott in his article "Bingi of Lawan" of the Lakanate of Lawan which one of the chieftain was Datu Iberein. The Scott article wrote in the Bingi of Lawan epic: "There lived in this place a chief called Karagrag, who was its lord and ruler. He was married to a lady of his rank called Bingi, a name which had been bestowed on her because of her chastity, as we shall see. I was not able to find out if she came from the same town; most probably she was from upstream on the Catubig River, where she was the daughter of the chief there."

Another tale was mentioned that the name Catubig was also a product of a 'word compact' between Americans and Filipinos. It was stated that an American surveyors saw a cat sunbathing by rolling along the grassy edge of the brook. They then approached a young lady who was doing her laundry and asked, “What is that, cat?” The lass, hardly seeing the cat which was in higher elevation, and not knowing what the foreigners were asking about simply responded, “Tubig,” meaning the water of the brook.

During the Philippine–American War, Catubig was the scene of a battle between the Warays and the Americans known as the Siege of Catubig.  The Siege of Catubig was fought for four days beginning April 15, 1900.

Geography

Barangays
Catubig is politically subdivided into 47 barangays.

Climate

Demographics

Economy

Landmarks
Hanging Bridge of Catubig
St. Joseph Parish Church
Battle of Catubig Shrine

References

External links
 [ Philippine Standard Geographic Code]
 Philippine Census Information
 Local Governance Performance Management System
 The Battle of Catubig

Municipalities of Northern Samar